Aleksey Pyshinskiy (born 28 April 1993) is a Belarusian former professional footballer.

References

External links 
 
 
 Profile at abff.by

1993 births
Living people
Belarusian footballers
People from Luninets District
Association football midfielders
FC Granit Mikashevichi players
Sportspeople from Brest Region